Black Mask 2: City of Masks (黑俠II) is a 2002 Hong Kong action film directed by Tsui Hark. Andy On took over the role of Black Mask when original actor Jet Li opted not to return. The film also starred Tobin Bell, Jon Polito, Tyler Mane, Rob Van Dam, Traci Lords, and Scott Adkins.

Overview
Black Mask 2 is the sequel to the 1996 Black Mask, which was based on the 1992 manhua Black Mask by Li Chi-Tak. However, apart from the main character, the film is largely unrelated in story to the original film and follows Black Mask trying to find a cure for his supersoldier powers, all while being tracked by his creator, a giant brain (a detail at odds with the original film). The film also takes the tone of a fantastical superhero film, being set in a futuristic city, featuring a plot involving stopping a mutative DNA bomb and pitting the main character against a group of human-animal hybrid professional wrestlers.

Unlike the original film, which was in Cantonese and later dubbed into English, Black Mask 2 was predominantly produced in English. The film was later released dubbed into Cantonese in Hong Kong in 2003, with the voice direction being directed by Chapman To and Andy Lau being featured as a narrator for the Hong Kong version.

Plot
Kan Fung had escaped from the clutches of the organization responsible for his superhuman abilities. He plans to find any geneticist who will be able to cure him. Meanwhile, he has decided to use his powers for the greater of good, calling himself Black Mask. Lang, another high-ranking member of the organization, has been hired to find Black Mask and kill him.

Wrestling promoter King is gearing up for a major event and has his top wrestlers Claw, Iguana, Chameleon, Snake, and Wolf ready for battle. However, when the wrestler Hellraiser (real name Ross) is attacked by Iguana, who undergoes a radical transformation into an iguana-human hybrid, Black Mask comes to the rescue. Ross is seriously injured and Black Mask chases Iguana to a nearby Tower. When Iguana falls off, Black Mask catches his hand in hopes that he can help him. Iguana lets himself free of Black Mask's grip and falls to his death. A grief-stricken Chameleon, who was Iguana's girlfriend, witnesses Iguana's remains revert to his human form. It is soon revealed that the wrestlers had been experimented under Dr. Moloch, who gave the wrestlers animal DNA to enhance their skills. However, they soon discover the animal DNA have given them the ability to undergo transformations as animal-hybrids. They now intend to use their newfound abilities to track down Black Mask and kill him to avenge Iguana. Chameleon, whose body can blend in with her surroundings, goes rogue, takes off her clothes so that she can move about fully invisible, and vengefully stalks Black Mask.

Meanwhile, Black Mask has found the geneticist who may be able to cure him, Dr. Marco Leung. He would give her anonymous phone calls. In the meantime, Black Mask befriends Raymond, Ross's young son who idolizes both his father as well as Black Mask. When Black Mask scuffles with the invisible Chameleon, he is given a dose of animal DNA by Moloch. This turns him into a tiger-hybrid, which gives him the strength to fight-off Chameleon. Locating Dr. Leung, Black Mask warns her of the DNA and asks for her help. She learns of a chemical component that could be the key to cure the animal DNA for Black Mask. Sneaking out, Black Mask has another scuffle with the wrestlers but successfully finds the chemical needed for the animal cure. Fully cured of at least his animal DNA, Black Mask learns that his old nemesis Lang has incapacitated Moloch and has planted a bomb that has the capability of changing DNA throughout the city.  Black Mask takes on all of the wrestlers as well as Lang's top man, General Troy.

While confronting a nearly-invisible Chameleon, Black Mask finally reveals how Iguana actually killed himself and that he had intended to help him. Black Mask confronts Chameleon with what she already knows, which is that she is unable to control herself and that her body will eventually fade away, leaving her invisible forever. Feeling remorse and remembering her humanity, Chameleon stops her assault, turns semi-visible and withdraws. Chameleon later ambushes Thorn, one of the wrestlers, while fully invisible, stealing the bomb he is carrying and passing it on to Black Mask. Chameleon then remembers how Iguana died, resolves that she will never disappear and jumps to her death, successfully halting her body from disappearing completely.

Finally, Lang takes on Black Mask. At first Lang has the upper hand, but Black Mask successfully defeats Lang and stops the bomb from exploding. The next day, Dr. Leung receives a call from Kan Fung. She leaves the lab and gets on the back of Kan's motorcycle, which implies she has finally cured him of his original superhuman abilities.

Cast
 Andy On as Kan Fung / Black Mask
 Teresa Maria Herrera as Dr. Marco
 Tobin Bell as Dr. Moloch
 Tyler Mane as Thorn
 Oris Erhuero as "Wolf"
 Scott Adkins as Dr. Lang
 Sean Marquette as Raymond
 Traci Lords as "Chameleon"
 Jon Polito as King
 Andrew Bryniarski as Daniel "Iguana" Martinez
 Rob Van Dam as "Claw"
 Robert Allen Mukes as "Snake"
 Silvio Simac as Troy 
 Michael Bailey Smith as "Hellraiser" Ross

Oris Erhuero, Traci Lords, and Jon Polito have all been involved in the Highlander Franchise.

The film was the first on-screen appearance of Andy On, but it was actually the second film On had shot. The first film he worked on, Looking for Mister Perfect, was released after this film in 2003.

Release
Columbia TriStar Home Entertainment released straight to DVD in the United States on December 24, 2002. The film was released theatrically in Hong Kong on January 9, 2003.

Cantonese voice cast
Andy Lau - Narrator
Louis Koo - Thorn
Lau Ching-wan - Wolf
Jordan Chan - Lang
Cecilia Cheung - Raymond
Cherrie Ying - Chameleon
Chapman To - King
Michael Tse - Iguana
Patrick Tam - Claw
Raymond Wong Ho-yin - Snake

References

External links
 
 
 

2002 films
Hong Kong science fiction action films
Hong Kong martial arts films
Hong Kong superhero films
Hong Kong sequel films
China Star Entertainment Group films
Films directed by Tsui Hark
2002 science fiction action films
Martial arts science fiction films
2002 martial arts films
2000s superhero films
2000s Hong Kong films